Macroglossum faro, the large hummingbird hawkmoth, is a moth of the family Sphingidae. It is known from southern India, Thailand, south-eastern China, southern Japan (Ryukyu Archipelago), Vietnam, Malaysia (Peninsular, Sarawak) and Indonesia (Sumatra, Java, Kalimantan).

The wingspan is 74–78 mm. It is the largest known Macroglossum species. It is similar in colour and pattern to Macroglossum passalus, but the thorax upperside and sometimes the first abdominal tergites are green, with no sharply defined dark area on the mesothoracic tegula. The abdomen has yellow patches which are comparatively smaller. The hindwing underside base is obviously shaded with yellow.

Subspecies
Macroglossum faro faro
Macroglossum faro cottoni Cadiou, 2000 (Sulawesi)

References

Macroglossum
Moths described in 1779
Moths of Asia
Moths of Japan